Bassozetus is a genus of cusk-eels found in Atlantic, Indian and Pacific Ocean.

Species
There are currently 13 recognized species in this genus:
 Bassozetus compressus (Günther, 1878) (Abyssal assfish) 
 Bassozetus galatheae J. G. Nielsen & Merrett, 2000 (Galathea assfish)
 Bassozetus glutinosus (Alcock, 1890) (Glutin assfish)
 Bassozetus levistomatus Machida, 1989
 Bassozetus mozambiquensis Tomiyama, Takami & A. Fukui, 2016 (Mozambique assfish) 
 Bassozetus multispinis Shcherbachev, 1980
 Bassozetus nasus Garman, 1899
 Bassozetus normalis Gill, 1883
 Bassozetus oncerocephalus (Vaillant, 1888)
 Bassozetus robustus H. M. Smith & Radcliffe, 1913 (Robust assfish)
 Bassozetus taenia (Günther, 1887)
 Bassozetus werneri J. G. Nielsen & Merrett, 2000
 Bassozetus zenkevitchi Rass (ru), 1955

References

Ophidiidae